Francis Tiburtius Roche was the first bishop of the Roman Catholic Diocese of Tuticorin.

Early life
Bishop Francis Tiburtius Roche was born in Punnaikayal on 14 April 1879. He joined the Society of Jesus and was ordained a priest on 2 October 1910. When the Roman Catholic Diocese of Tuticorin was erected on 12 June 1923,  he was appointed the first bishop of the diocese on the same day and was consecrated bishop on 23 September 1923. He is the first indigenous bishop of Latin Rite in India, in Asia, in China (first chinese bishop in 1926) and in Africa (first african bishop in 1939).

Significance
He was the first native Indian bishop of Latin Church in the modern times and he was entrusted with the first Indian Latin Catholic diocese, the Diocese of Tuticorin with native priests.  He was succeeded by Bishop Thomas Fernando and died on 17 December 1955.

References

1879 births
1955 deaths
Society of Jesus
20th-century Roman Catholic bishops in India